This article provides two lists:
A list of National Basketball Association players by total career playoff points scored.
A progressive list of scoring leaders showing how the record increased through the years.

Scoring leaders 
This article provides a list of National Basketball Association players by total career playoff points scored.

Statistics accurate as of the 2022 NBA playoffs.

Progressive list of playoff scoring leaders

This is a progressive list of scoring leaders showing how the record increased through the years.

Statistics accurate as of the 2022 NBA playoffs.

See also 
Basketball statistics
NBA post-season records

References

External links 
Basketball-Reference.com enumeration of NBA career playoff leaders in points scored

National Basketball Association lists
National Basketball Association statistical leaders